Chinese mulberry is a common name for several trees and may refer to:

 Morus, the mulberry genus, with several species widely cultivated in China for production of fruit and silk
 Morus alba, the most commonly cultivated mulberry in China, and the preferred feed for silkworms
 Morus australis, cultivated in China and native to southeast Asia
 Morus multicaulis, now classified as a variety of Morus alba
 Maclura tricuspidata, a plant related to the mulberries of the genus Morus, which produces similar edible fruits

See also 
 List of plants known as mulberry